Charles Power or Charles Powers may refer to:

 Charles Gavan Power (1888–1968), Canadian politician and ice hockey player
 Charles Power (field hockey) (1878–1953), Irish field hockey player
 Charles W. Power, American politician; mayor of Pittsfield, Massachusetts
 Sir Charles Powers (1853–1939),  Australian politician.
 Charles T. Powers (1943–1996), American journalist and writer
Charlie Power (politician) (born 1948), Canadian politician
Charlie Power (Canadian football) (born 1991), Canadian football running back